The Crystal Lake Falls Historic District, also known as the Brick Kingdom, is a historic industrial and residential area in Barton, Vermont, United States. It is located along Water Street and Main Street, roughly paralleling Willoughby Brook, whose waters powered the area's industries. It was added to the U.S. National Register of Historic Places on August 7, 1994.

The Brick Kingdom
The Crystal Lake Falls Historic District covers several blocks of Barton village, located at northwest corner of Crystal Lake. It extends roughly along Water Street from Church to Main Street, along Main from Water to Duck Pond Road, and along West Street from Cemetery Road to Main Street. The earliest documented industrial activity on the falls began in the 1790s, with Asa Kimball starting a sawmill in 1798 and a gristmill in 1807 on the upper falls. During the 19th century, factories clustered along Water Street, with a variety of manufacturing activities. Businesses located here manufactured piano works, furniture, ladies cotton lingerie and baseball bats. These mostly closed by the 1940s, with the last leaving in 1952. The mills employed about 300 workers.

Mills and other local industrial activities included the following:
 Heyward Chair Company 1860–1890
 Charles Ufford Carriage Maker 1868 – circa 1892
 Barton Woolen Mill (carding wool, buying and selling wool) 1875–1926. One of the last carding mills in the country.
 J.W. Murkland – manufactured machinery, operated a foundry, produced plows, bobbin and spool machinery, etc. 1876–1941
 Peerless Manufacturing Company 1892–1924. employed 100 women and a few men to produce ladies and children's underwear.
 Barton Wood Heel and Lumber Company. Using the Peerless plant, 1924–1938.
 Butter tub factory 1893–1916. Employed up to 60 men. A 1916 fire put these men out of work and had a considerable effect on the community, when these unemployed people moved out with their families. Many were Catholic and their departure had a particularly detrimental effect on the local church for many years.
 Percival Manufacturing Company 1889–1905
 Pillsbury and Baldwin Company 1906–1911. Manufactured toilet tanks and seats. Employed up to 40 men
 Wessell, Nickel and Gross 1919–1941. Manufactured piano actions. Employed up to 42 men.
 Barton Wood Products Company 1943. Used former Wessel, Nickel and Gross plant. Employed 50. Burned on New Year's Eve.
 Progressive Furniture Company 1944–1952.Repaired Barton Wood Products building. Manufactured wooden chairs. 1944–1952. Employed 30 people.
 Table factory circa 1903–1933. Made tables and bookcases.
 Tower brothers. Grist mill. circa 1880 – circa 1906
 Barron Wedgewood Horseshoe 1908–1920. Manufactured a specialized horseshoe that would prevent snow buildup.
 Commercial Ice Harvesting 1870–1947+
 Granite Quarries 1888 – circa 1935

See also

National Register of Historic Places listings in Orleans County, Vermont

Footnotes

Barton, Vermont
Historic districts on the National Register of Historic Places in Vermont
National Register of Historic Places in Orleans County, Vermont
Vermont culture
Historic districts in Orleans County, Vermont